Charles Edward Hammett Sr. (January 29, 1865 – October 2, 1945) was an American football and basketball coach and college athletics administrator.  He served as the head football coach at Northwestern University from 1910 to 1912 and at Allegheny College from 1913 to 1917 and in 1919, compiling a career college football record of 35–19–6.  Hammett was also the head basketball coach at Northwestern (1911–1912) and Allegheny (1913–1918, 1919–1920, 1921–1922), tallying a career college basketball mark of 60–41.  In addition, he served as Northwestern's athletic director from 1910 to 1913.

Hammett was born in Frederick County, Maryland in 1865 to David Calvin and Ellen (née Krieger) Hammett.  He died of a stroke in 1945 at the age of 80.

Head coaching record

Football

References

External links
 

1865 births
1945 deaths
Allegheny Gators football coaches
Allegheny Gators men's basketball coaches
Basketball coaches from Maryland
Northwestern Wildcats athletic directors
Northwestern Wildcats football coaches
Northwestern Wildcats men's basketball coaches
People from Frederick County, Maryland
Sportspeople from the Washington metropolitan area